The East Natuna gas field (former name: Natuna D-Alpha block) is a large natural gas field located in the South China Sea off northern Natuna Island, Indonesia. It is within the disagreed area claimed by China.

History
The field was discovered in 1973 by Agip.  In 1980, the Indonesian state-owned oil company Pertamina and Exxon formed a joint venture to develop Natuna D-Alpha. However, due to the high  content the partnership was not able to start production.  In 1995, the Indonesian government signed a contract with Exxon but in 2007, the contract was terminated.  In 2008, the block was awarded to Pertamina.

The new agreement was signed between Pertamina and ExxonMobil in 2010. Correspondingly, the field was renamed East Natuna to be geographically more precise.  In 2011, the principal of agreement was signed between Pertamina, ExxonMobil, Total S.A. and Petronas.  In 2012, Petronas was replaced by PTT Exploration and Production.  As of 2016, negotiations about the new principal of agreement have not finalized and consequently, a production sharing contract is not signed.

Reserves and development
The reservoir is at a water depth of  within the Miocene Terumbu Formation with a crest at  subsea. The  content of the resource is about 71%.

The development of East Natuna is expected to cost US$20–40 billion.  To save costs, the joint development of East Natuna, Tuna block (Premier Oil 65%, Mitsui Oil Exploration 35%), and South Natuna Sea Block B (ConocoPhillips 40%, Inpex 35%, Chevron Corporation 25%) has been proposed.  Production is expected to be viable only if the oil price exceeds $100 per barrel. The production is expected to start not before 2030.

References

Natural gas fields in Indonesia
Natuna Regency
South China Sea